Tibor Florian Moldovan  (born 3 May 1982) is a former Romanian professional footballer.

External links

1982 births
Living people
Sportspeople from Târgu Mureș
Romanian footballers
CSM Unirea Alba Iulia players
FCV Farul Constanța players
FC Dinamo București players
Association football forwards
People from Târgu Mureș
Nyíregyháza Spartacus FC players
Újpest FC players
Romanian expatriate footballers
Expatriate footballers in Hungary
ACF Gloria Bistrița players
CS Luceafărul Oradea players
Liga I players
Nemzeti Bajnokság I players